"Oxbow Lakes" is a single by ambient house artists The Orb.  It featured remixes from artists such as Carl Craig, Sabres of Paradise and A Guy Called Gerald. It also includes an acoustic version performed by the string sextet Instrumental which was produced and mixed by Darren Allison. It reached number thirty-eight on the UK Singles Chart.

References

External links

The Orb songs
1995 singles
1995 songs
Island Records singles
Music videos directed by Mike Lipscombe